The third season of Românii au talent is aired on ProTV from 15 February 2013. ProTV kept the same team, Smiley and Pavel Bartoș presenters, Andra, Mihai Petre and Andi Moisescu jurors. The first episode brought the highest audience for a debut of a season registered so far, over five million viewers per minute.

Semi-finalists

Semi-final 1 (5 April)

Semi-final 2 (12 April)

Semi-final 3 (19 April)

Semi-final 4 (26 April)

Semi-final 5 (3 May)

Final (10 May)

Ratings

References

External links
 Romanii au talent at protv.ro

Românii au talent
2013 Romanian television seasons